Cave Hills National Forest was established as the Cave Hills Forest Reserve in South Dakota by the General Land Office March 5, 1904 with . After the transfer of federal forests to the U.S. Forest Service in 1905, it became a National Forest on March 4, 1907.  On July 1, 1908 it was absorbed by Sioux National Forest and the name was discontinued. 

The forest today comprises the Cave Hills unit of the Sioux Ranger District of Custer National Forest, in Harding County, north of Buffalo.

References

External links
Sioux Ranger District, Custer National Forest
Forest History Society
Forest History Society:Listing of the National Forests of the United States Text from Davis, Richard C., ed. Encyclopedia of American Forest and Conservation History. New York: Macmillan Publishing Company for the Forest History Society, 1983. Vol. II, pp. 743-788.

Former National Forests of South Dakota
Geography of Harding County, South Dakota